Floquet is a French or Catalan surname. Notable people with the surname include:
Charles Floquet, French prime minister
Étienne-Joseph Floquet, French composer
Gaston Floquet, French mathematician

Floquet is also the name of:
Snowflake (gorilla) ("Floquet de Neu"), gorilla resident in Barcelona

French-language surnames